Emst is a village in the municipality of Epe in the province of Gelderland in the Netherlands.  It is the birthplace of former footballer Marc Overmars. Emst is located in the forest area of Veluwe. 

Emst was first mentioned between 1255 and 1256 as van Emze. The etymology is unknown. In 1860, it was home to 1,280 people. A Dutch Reformed Church was built in 1864. It burnt down in 1930, but was rebuilt the same year.

Gallery

References 

Populated places in Gelderland
Epe